Osmo Heikki Puhakka (born 1 January 1948 in Elimäki) is a Finnish Lutheran clergyman and politician. He was a member of the Parliament of Finland from 1999 to 2003, representing the Centre Party.

References

1948 births
Living people
People from Elimäki
20th-century Finnish Lutheran clergy
Centre Party (Finland) politicians
Members of the Parliament of Finland (1999–2003)
University of Helsinki alumni
21st-century Finnish Lutheran clergy